Lucy Rose Parton (born 20 June 1989) is an English singer-songwriter and musician who performs as Lucy Rose. Her debut album, Like I Used To, was released in 2012. Rose released her second album, Work It Out, in 2015 on Columbia Records. Her third album, Something's Changing, was released in 2017 on Communion Records.

Life and career

Born in Camberley, Surrey, England. Rose's musical origins began with her playing drums in her school orchestra; her songwriting started with her writing tunes on her family home's piano. She is the youngest of three sisters. She later bought a guitar from a shop she passed on the way to school, taught herself and began writing material at around the age of sixteen. Rose never played her material for anyone until she left home after completing her A-levels.

At eighteen, she moved to London; instead of taking her place at University College London to study geography, she began experimenting and performing with other musicians. It was at this time when she met Jack Steadman, the frontman of Bombay Bicycle Club. After becoming friends, Steadman asked if she would like to perform vocals on a song he had written and was recording. The acoustic album Flaws came out with Steadman on lead vocals, and Rose performing backing vocals, most notably on the title track "Flaws", as well as others on the album. She went on to perform some backing vocal duties on Bombay Bicycle Club's third album, A Different Kind of Fix, and features in their fourth, So Long, See You Tomorrow. Rose also performs some backing vocal duties on the track This Sullen Welsh Heart by the Manic Street Preachers on their album Rewind the Film. In 2018 she provided backing vocals for Paul Weller's fourteenth studio album True Meanings, and appeared on stage with him in 2019 for his Royal Festival Hall concert, Other Aspects.

A fan of tea, Rose began selling her own blend named "Builder Grey" (two part English Breakfast and one part Earl Grey) at her shows as a substitute for merchandise or CDs.

Debut album: Like I Used To (2012–2015)
In 2012, Rose started recording her debut album Like I Used To, with producer Charlie Hugall at her parents' house in Warwickshire.  On 12 May 2012, she was signed to the record label Columbia Records. The album was released on 24 September. Vogue magazine stated that she was "one of indie music's breakout stars for 2012". Her song, "Don't You Worry" appeared on the TV show Skins on the second episode of the sixth season. "Be Alright" was featured in the finale episode of series five of The Vampire Diaries.

Rose then began touring the UK, the United States and Canada with Bombay Bicycle Club and Noah and the Whale in February and March 2012. She played at the Live at Leeds festival in May 2012. She played a set at the Bread & Rose's stage at Kent's Hop Farm Festival on 30 June, the same day as Bob Dylan. She played at The Magic Loungeabout (Broughton Hall, North Yorkshire) in July 2012.
She also played at Latitude Festival in July 2012, Y Not Festival and Green Man Festival in August 2012, plus Bestival in September 2012. She played Reading/Leeds Festival 2012, and performed an acoustic version of "Bikes", a single from the album, on BBC Three, during their coverage of the festival. Rose headlined the main stage on Friday of Fieldview Festival near Chippenham, Wiltshire.

"Night Bus" appeared on the MTV reality TV show Catfish: The TV Show on the tenth episode of the first season. Later in 2013, Sony Mobile chose Rose to perform the soundtrack of the official TV advertisement of Sony's Flagship mobile phone Sony Xperia Z1; the song "Movin' On Up" was composed and arranged by Gillespie/Young/Innes, courtesy of Columbia Records/Sony Music. In December 2013, Rose confirmed via Twitter that she had begun recording her second studio album, Work It Out, that was released on 13 July 2015. In 2014, "Shiver" was used as the opening theme for the second season of the anime series Mushishi.

In February 2015, "Shiver" was used as the closing song of Girls season 4 episode 5 starring Lena Dunham.

Second studio album: Work It Out (2015–2016)
In May 2015, Rose announced that her second studio record, Work It Out, showed her "development as a person". Her album was recorded in London's Snap Studios and produced by Rich Cooper, notable for his work alongside Mumford & Sons and Tom Odell.

In December 2015 Rose recorded three tracks for BBC Radio 1 at Maida Vale with Rae Morris. A version of one of these covers, Shakin' Stevens' "Merry Christmas Everyone", was used a year later on the BBC's promotional video for their seasonal programming.

Third studio album: Something's Changing (2016–2018)
In the spring of 2016, Rose was inspired by the number of tweets and Spotify streams coming from Latin America and decided to give something back to her fans in those territories. Rose offered a deal to her fans: "If you book me a gig, I'll come and stay."

For two months in 2016, Rose took her guitar and backpacked around Ecuador, Peru, Chile, Argentina, Paraguay, Uruguay, Brazil, and Mexico, playing free shows and staying with fans. While on this tour, she made a documentary, 'Something's Changing', of her experiences. The documentary was later screened at her concerts in beginning in 2017 and is available to stream on her official YouTube channel.

Due to the lukewarm critical reception of her sophomore album and the prospect of the lack of creative control for her forthcoming third album, she left Columbia Records in 2016 and later signed with the independent label, Communion Records, to release her third album.

Upon returning to the UK from her travels in Latin America, Rose began work on her third album, Something's Changing. The album was recorded in 17 days with producer Tim Bidwell, bassist Ben Daniel and drummer Chris Boot in Brighton. The album features appearances from Daughter's Elena Tonra and Matthew and The Atlas' Emma Gatrill. On two tracks vocal harmonies are provided by The Staves ("Floral Dresses" and "Is This Called Home").

Following the release of Something's Changing, Rose released two singles as bonus tracks: "End Up Here" in October 2017 and "All That Fear" in January 2018, both with accompanying music videos.

In May 2018, Rose announced she was going to release a Something's Changing remix album, which would feature new versions of every track on Something's Changing except "Floral Dresses", "Find Myself" and "I Can't Change It All", plus an "All That Fear" remix. Among the producers who remixed her tracks are musicians/producers Fryars, Get Cape. Wear Cape. Fly and Liz Lawrence. The digital-only album was released 6 July 2018.

Rose featured on the track "Thank You" from Logic's fourth studio album, YSIV, released on 28 September 2018. She previously featured on his track "Innermission" from Logic's second album, The Incredible True Story, and on "Anziety" from his third album, Everybody.

Fourth studio album: No Words Left (2019–present)
On 11 January 2019, Rose announced her fourth album would be titled No Words Left, with a release date of 22 March 2019 and an accompanying European tour. The album deals with Rose's mental health. She also released the first single, "Conversation", and accompanying video. She released the second single, "Solo(w)", in February, and the third, "Treat Me Like A Woman", in March 2019.

In May 2020, Rose released two standalone singles, "Question It All" and "White Car".

In August 2022, Rose announced a special gold vinyl reissue of Like I Used To for its tenth anniversary in September.

Influences
Rose's musical exploration and exposure to new music began with her move to London. In interviews, she has shown an affection for Neil Young, Joni Mitchell, and Adele.

Personal life
Rose is married to tour manager William Morris. Her sister-in-law is British singer-songwriter Rae Morris. In early 2019, she and her husband relocated from London to Brighton.

Discography

Albums

Live albums

Singles

References

External links
 

1989 births
Living people
People from Camberley
People from Warwickshire
Musicians from Surrey
English women singer-songwriters
English folk guitarists
21st-century English women singers
21st-century English singers